The A70 road is a major road in Scotland, United Kingdom . It begins as Dalry Road at the Haymarket, Edinburgh junction with the A8, passing near but not through Lanark and ending as Miller Road in Ayr. Between Edinburgh city centre and Lanark it passes through the Edinburgh suburbs of Slateford, Juniper Green, Currie and Balerno; then Carnwath (where the A70 joins the A721 for three miles), Carstairs (where the two roads separate again), and Ravenstruther, while between Lanark and Ayr it passes through Hyndford Bridge, Rigside, Douglas, Muirkirk, Smallburn, Cumnock, Ochiltree, and Coylton.

The Scots name of the road is the "Lang Whang", a whang in the Scots tongue being a narrow strip of leather, usually a long leather bootlace. Much of the road is over elevated, desolate moorland; it ascends several times on its course to heights over 1000 feet above sea level. Because the wind enjoys an easy and uninterrupted passage over its length, in winter the road is frequently closed by snow, even by modest snowfalls. The road passes elevated farmland and grouse moor and presents extensive views over central Scotland to the north.

According to tradition, Robert Burns stopped at the formerly thatched Wee Bush Inn in Carnwath on his way to Edinburgh: quite a likely event since the road is the most direct link between the Scottish capital and Burn's native Ayrshire. As the story has it, all Burns could think of to engrave on the inn window (a habit for which he had a reputation) was, "Lang Whang, Lang Whang, Lang bloody Whang", which neatly sums up the prospect for anybody facing the walk, ride or cycle along it, especially in winter. It was one of the roads along which the murderers Burke and Hare brought the cadavers of their victims for the Edinburgh Medical College to dissect.

The Collins 2012 Big Road Atlas shows the A70 as one of the five most dangerous roads in Scotland, based on the number of serious and fatal accidents between 2007 and 2009 in proportion to traffic. There are many extremely dangerous sections: particular blackspots are the crown of Auchinoon Brae on the approach to Harperigg Reservoir and the right angled bends at the east end of the reservoir. Any of the undulating and winding terrain between Balerno and Carnwath where oncoming cars can be concealed by dips in the road can be considered dangerous and there is barely a half-mile stretch of the Lang Whang between Balerno and Carnwath which has not witnessed a fatal accident over the past twenty years.

The A70 is purportedly the scene of one of Scotland's best-known UFO incidents, now known as 'the A70 incident'. Two men, Garry Wood and Colin Wright, were travelling one evening in 1992 from the outskirts of Edinburgh to the village of Tarbrax. Something evidently caused them to be delayed, for they arrived at their destination much later than expected. Several months later the pair underwent hypnotic regression and claimed to recall that they had been abducted, examined and communicated with by alien creatures.

From Little Vantage on the A70 near Harperrig Reservoir, a footpath (called Thieves Road) heads south across the upper reaches of the Water of Leith and continues across moorland to a pass over the Pentland Hills called Cauldstane Slap and on to West Linton. This was part of a much longer drove road used in past centuries for transporting cattle south from the central belt and northern Scotland to Peebles and ultimately to the English markets, and for moving sheep north from West Linton market.

References

Roads in Scotland
Transport in South Ayrshire
Transport in Edinburgh
Ayr
Transport in East Ayrshire
Transport in South Lanarkshire
Cumnock
Carstairs
Transport in West Lothian